The Fairly OddParents: Breakin' Da Rules is a video game released for the Game Boy Advance, GameCube, PlayStation 2, Xbox, and Windows in North America in 2003. It is based on the Nickelodeon cartoon The Fairly OddParents. It was developed by Blitz Games and published by THQ.

Its sequel, The Fairly OddParents: Shadow Showdown was released on the same platforms, except the Xbox.

Plot
Timmy Turner's parents have gone on a vacation and left Timmy with evil babysitter Vicky. When Timmy tries to make a wish, his fairy godparents Cosmo and Wanda tell him that it's against "Da Rules". Outraged, Timmy wishes he didn't have to follow the rules, leading Cosmo to destroy the book. When Vicky arrives, she gains possession of Da Rules. She wishes that Timmy was still sleeping, and since she has possession of a fairy item, her wish is granted. Timmy, Cosmo, and Wanda go to Fairy Court, where they're accused of destroying Da Rules, and Jorgen gives the three of them 49½ hours to find the book's missing pages. Timmy must navigate through ten levels and find the pages before Vicky's wishing goes too far. By the end of the game, everything is back to normal and Da Rules has all of its pages back.

The PC version features a different plot. In this version, Juandissimo Magnifico tricks Timmy into wishing the book destroyed so that Cosmo and Wanda will get in trouble for it. It also notably features an appearance by Vicky and Tootie's mother (at Timmy's age, as the level featuring her is set in the past), named Nicky. She is shown behaving a lot like Tootie, and Timmy initially mistakes her for Tootie when he first sees her, although the in-game graphics depict her as resembling a young Vicky.

In the Game Boy Advance version, Anti-Cosmo and Anti-Wanda steal the book, and use Vicky's dreams as a conduit for their magic. As punishment, Cosmo and Wanda are demoted to 3rd-Class Fairies. In response, they arm Timmy with an anti-magic backpack and magic cannon. Eventually, the Anti-Fairies are defeated and Cosmo and Wanda wake Vicky, restoring peace and convincing Jorgen to promote them back to 1st-Class Fairies.

Voice cast
Source: closing credits
 Tara Strong as Timmy Turner
 Daran Norris as Cosmo, Dad, Jorgen von Strangle, Crimson Chin, Comicbook Anchorman; Anti-Cosmo (Game Boy Advance version only)
 Susanne Blakeslee: Wanda, Mom
 Grey DeLisle as Vicky, Tootie (console version only), Nicky (PC version only), Spatula Woman, Créme Puffs
 Gary LeRoi Gray as AJ
 Jason Marsden as Chester, Male Shopper
 Carlos Alazraqui as Crocker, Juandissimo, Le Foot, (PC version only), Mayor of Dimmsdale, Country Boy
 Faith Abrahams as Female Shopper, Franciscus
 Laraine Newman as Alien Queen Jipjorrulac
 Rob Paulsen as King Grippulon, Dog Catcher, Fairy Judge, Guard, Anti-Fairies, Squirrelly Scouts, Arthur, Gilded Arches

Reception

The game received mixed to positive reviews. IGN gave this game 5.0/10. The GameRankings aggregate score was highest for the PlayStation 2 version (73%); the others were slightly negative, as far down as 40% on the PC.

References

2003 video games
English-language-only video games
Game Boy Advance games
GameCube games
THQ games
Gorilla Systems games
PlayStation 2 games
Xbox games
Video games developed in the United Kingdom
The Fairly OddParents
Windows games
Breakin' Da Rules
Video games with cel-shaded animation
North America-exclusive video games
3D platform games
Single-player video games
Video games developed in the United States
Blitz Games Studios games